The Fifth Regiment Armory is a historic National Guard armory located in Baltimore, Maryland, United States. It is an imposing, fortress-type structure situated in midtown Baltimore. It consists of a full basement, a first floor containing a 200 foot by 300 foot drill hall, a mezzanine or "balcony" level, and a newer second level (reconstructed in 1933 after a fire) housing the trussed steel drill hall roof.  The façade features buttresses, parapets, casement windows, and a crenellated roofline, giving the appearance of a medieval fortification. It was the site of the 1912 Democratic National Convention.

The Fifth Regiment Armory was designed by architects Wyatt & Nolting.  It was listed on the National Register of Historic Places in 1985. It is included within the Baltimore National Heritage Area.

On October 31, 1958, President Dwight Eisenhower delivered a televised speech from the Fifth Regiment Armory.  The event, promoting Republican Party candidates in that year's midterm elections, was attended by Maryland Governor Theodore McKeldin, Senator John Glenn Beall, Jr., Senator John Marshall Butler, and Congressman James Devereux.

Museum 
The Maryland Museum of Military History, housed at the Armory, collects artifacts and runs programming related to Maryland's militias, dating back to Colonial times, and present-day branches of the military.

References

External links
, including photo from 1980, at Maryland Historical Trust
Fifth Regiment Armory Baltimore, Maryland; Office of the Secretary of State of Maryland website
 Fifth Regiment Armory – Explore Baltimore Heritage

Government buildings on the National Register of Historic Places in Baltimore
Infrastructure completed in 1901
Renaissance Revival architecture in Maryland
Baltimore National Heritage Area
Downtown Baltimore
Midtown, Baltimore